Kandali may refer to:

Madhava Kandali, a 14th-century Assamese poet
Kandali Festival, a festival held by the Bhotiya tribe of the Pithoragarh district of Uttarakhand state in India
Strobilanthes wallichii, a plant from the Himalayas that flowers every 12 years
Lagenaria vulgaris, a species of gourd-bearing vine 
Urtica dioica, a plant better known as Stinging Nettle